David G. Romano (born June 1, 1940) is a Canadian former curler. He played third on the 1972 Brier Champion team (skipped by Orest Meleschuk), representing Manitoba. They later went on to win the World Championships in Garmisch-Partenkirchen of that year.

References

External links
 
 David Romano – Curling Canada Stats Archive

Brier champions
1940 births
Living people
Curlers from Manitoba
World curling champions
Canadian male curlers